

Draughts historians
This is a list of people who wrote about draughts or checkers.

José Brunet y Bellet  
Manuel Cárceles Sabater  
William Shelley Branch  
Edward B. Hanes
Godefridus Laurentius Gortmans
Harold James Ruthven Murray
Karel Wendel Kruijswijk  
Gerard Bakker 
Arie van der Stoep
Franco Pratesi
Rob Jansen
Govert Westerveld  
 Thierry Depaulis.
José Antonio Garzón Roger

Notes

historians